Butt v Kelson [1952] Ch 197 is a UK company law and English trusts law case concerning the right of a beneficiary to direct its trustees to exercise votes on company shares that the trust possesses.

Facts
Ms Kelson was one of three directors of a company called Weston-super-Mare Residential Flats Ltd. She and the other directors were also the trustees of the will of a Mr Robert Butt, which possessed 22,100 out of the 22,852 ordinary shares in the company. They had used the shares to appoint themselves as directors. After Mr Robert Henry Butt died, his son Mr Robert Arthur Butt, who was entitled to a large proportion of the residuary estate was dissatisfied at how the company was being run. He wanted to inspect all the documents which came into the directors' possession, and claimed to be able to do so by virtue of his large beneficial interest.

Judgment
Romer LJ held that if Mr Arthur Butt wished to see the company documents, made a proper case for it, and was not met by any objection of other beneficiaries, he should be allowed. This was so, not because directors could be compelled qua directors, but because it would avoid them being compelled to use their voting power, which they held on trust, to make them do so. The beneficiaries were entitled to be treated as though they were the registered shareholders in respect of trust shares. If necessary, they could compel the trustee directors to use their votes as the beneficiaries. If the beneficiaries themselves were not in agreement then the court could exercise the power.

Romer LJ said the following.

Evershed MR and Birkett LJ concurred.

See also
UK company law
English trust law
Fiduciary
Kirby v Wilkins [1929] Ch 444
Schmidt v Rosewood Trust Ltd [2003] UKPC 26, [65]

Notes

References
Tempest v Lord Camoys (1882) LR 21 ChD 571, Lord Jessel MR
In re Cowin (1886) 33 ChD 179
Re Whichelow (George) or Bradshaw v Orpen [1954] 1 WLR 5, Upjohn J
E McGaughey, 'Does Corporate Governance Exclude the Ultimate Investor?' (2016) 16(1) Journal of Corporate Law Studies 221 
RC Nolan, ‘Indirect Investors: A Greater Say in the Company?’ (2003) 3(1) Journal of Corporate Law Studies 73

United Kingdom company case law
English trusts case law
Court of Appeal (England and Wales) cases
1952 in case law
1952 in British law